The League of Democratic Socialists was an Austrian political party formerly affiliated with the World Socialist Movement (WSM).

Unlike most other WSM parties, it did not start as an offshoot of the Socialist Party of Great Britain (SPGB). The party contested the 1959 legislative election, getting 2,190 votes (0.05%).

Sources 
 

Former Companion Parties of the World Socialist Movement
Socialist parties in Austria